The Ustilaginales are an order of fungi within the class Ustilaginomycetes. The order contains 8 families, 49 genera, and 851 species.

Ustinaginales is also known and classified as the smut fungi. They are serious plant pathogens, with only the dikaryotic stage being obligately parasitic.

Morphology
Has a thick-walled resting spore (teliospore), known as the "brand" (burn) spore or chlamydospore.

Economic importance
They can infect corn plants (Zea mays) producing tumor-like galls that render the ears unsaleable. This corn smut, is also known as huitlacoche and sold canned for consumption in Latin America.

See also
 Huitlacoche

References
Notes

Bibliography
C.J. Alexopolous, Charles W. Mims, M. Blackwell  et al., Introductory Mycology, 4th ed. (John Wiley and Sons, Hoboken NJ, 2004)  

Ustilaginomycotina
Fungal plant pathogens and diseases
Basidiomycota orders